HMS Ilex was one of nine s destroyer built for the Royal Navy during the 1930s. She is the only ship of the Royal Navy ever to have been named after Ilex, the genus of flowering plants commonly known as holly.

Description
The I-class ships were improved versions of the preceding H-class. They were powered by two Parsons geared steam turbines, each driving one propeller shaft, using steam provided by three Admiralty three-drum boilers. Their crew numbered 145 officers and ratings.

The ships mounted four 4.7-inch (120 mm) Mark IX guns in single mounts, designated 'A', 'B', 'X' and 'Y' from bow to stern. For anti-aircraft (AA) defence, they had two quadruple mounts for the 0.5 inch Vickers Mark III machine gun. The I class was fitted with two above-water quintuple torpedo tube mounts amidships for  torpedoes. One depth charge rack and two throwers were fitted; 16 depth charges were originally carried, but this increased to 35 shortly after the war began. The I-class ships were fitted with the ASDIC sound detection system to locate submarines underwater.

Construction and career

1939
On the outbreak of war Ilex was deployed in the Mediterranean with the Third Destroyer Flotilla. She was immediately transferred to the Western Approaches for convoy escort duty with her flotilla.

1940

The first half of 1940 saw Ilex conducting Fleet screening duties in and around the North Sea. In May she transferred to the Second Destroyer Flotilla for service in the Mediterranean. The submarine was forced to the surface and scuttled by her crew.

Continuous service with the Mediterranean Fleet continued through 1940, and on 11 November she was deployed as a screening destroyer for  during the attack on the Italian Fleet at Taranto.

1941
On 20 March she formed part of the destroyer screen for the fleet at the Battle of Cape Matapan. On 14 June she suffered major structural damage from dive-bombing near misses during an operation to prevent interference by Vichy French warships.  She was towed to Haifa and underwent a series of temporary repairs there, and at Suez, Aden, Mombassa and Durban, in order to reach the United States of America for a refit and full repair.

1942
It was not until September 1942 that Ilex was re-commissioned. She spent the rest of the year at Freetown, Sierra Leone, conducting convoy duties.

1943
In February 1943 Ilex returned to the Mediterranean, and in July and August she participated in the Sicily and Salerno landings. In December she was withdrawn from operational service because of a high defect load and poor availability.

1944
Ilex was laid up at Bizerte in Tunisia, then transferred to Ferryville in June, and laid up there.

1945
In March 1945 the destroyer was towed to Malta for repair, and in April reduced to "reserve category C", the survey declaring her "not required for further operational service".  She was placed on the disposal list in August.

Disposal
Ilex was sold for scrap at Malta on 22 January 1946 and broken up in Sicily in 1948.

Sea Cadet Corps
Salford Sea Cadets are affiliated with the ship and are named TS Ilex. Salford sea cadets are located in Worsley and provide youth services to young people aged 10–18 from across the City of Salford.

The unit was incorporated in 1936 during Eccles warship week and is one of the oldest continuously operating youth groups in the city. The current City of Salford Sea Cadets is an amalgamation of Eccles and District Sea Cadets (TS Ilex) and Salford Sea Cadets (TS Irwell). The unit moved to its present home in Worsley in the late 1980s.

City of Salford Sea Cadets while an independent charity in its own right is also part of the larger Sea Cadet Corps

Notes

Bibliography
 
 
 
 
 
 
 
 

 

I-class destroyers of the Royal Navy
Ships built on the River Clyde
1937 ships
World War II destroyers of the United Kingdom